The 15th Selangor state election will be held in 2023 to elect the State Assembly members of the 15th Selangor State Legislative Assembly, the legislature of the Malaysian state of Selangor.

Selangor is one of the states which did not dissolve simultaneously with Dewan Rakyat on 10 October 2022. It was decided by Pakatan Harapan on 15 October 2022. In January 2023, it was announced the election would feature the Green Party of Malaysia's electoral debut.

Background 
In the 2018 general election, Pakatan Harapan won the state of Selangor, winning 51 out of the 56 state seats. Despite the Sheraton Move occurring in the beginning of 2020, the various changes during the 2020 - 2022 Malaysian political crisis did not affect the politics at the state level, allowing the Pakatan Harapan state government to continue to govern. 

On 6 August 2020, the Chief Minister of Penang, Chow Kon Yeow, reiterated his stance that all states that have a Pakatan Harapan government, including Selangor, would not dissolve the state assemblies in order to coincide with a snap general election. This was because at the time, the Penang, Selangor and Negeri Sembilan state governments had a stable majority. The Pakatan Harapan leadership further emphasized that there will not be a dissolution in 2021 and 2022, citing various factors, such as the ongoing COVID-19 pandemic, the need for the state governments to complete a full term, and the possibility of various factors which might inconvenience people should the state elections be called at the wrong time, such as floods, ahead of the 2022 Malaysian general election.

On 10 October 2022, Malaysian Prime Minister Ismail Sabri Yaakob dissolved Parliament, resulting in a snap general election being held in Malaysia on 19 November 2022. Traditionally, every state in Malaysia except Sarawak would hold their state elections concurrently with the general election for the sake of convenience, but since 2020, several Malaysian states held state elections separately from the general election, with Sabah on 26 September 2020, Melaka on 20 November 2021, Sarawak on 18 December 2021 and Johor on 12 March 2022. With the exception of Perlis, Perak and Pahang holding state elections during the 2022 Malaysian general election, all other states, including Selangor, will hold their state elections in 2023.

Constituencies 
All 56 constituencies within Selangor, which constitute the Selangor State Legislative Assembly, were contested during the election.

Composition before dissolution

Timeline 
The key dates are listed below.

Retiring incumbent 
The following members of the 14th State Legislative Assembly retired.

Electoral candidates

Results 

|-
! rowspan=2 colspan=4 style="background-color:#E9E9E9;text-align:center;" | Party
! rowspan=2 style="background-color:#E9E9E9;text-align:center;" |Candidates
! colspan=2 style="background-color:#E9E9E9;text-align:center;" |Vote
! colspan=3 style="background-color:#E9E9E9;text-align:center;" |Seats
|-
! style="background-color:#E9E9E9;text-align:center;" |Votes
! style="background-color:#E9E9E9;text-align:center;" |%
! style="background-color:#E9E9E9;text-align:center;" |Won
! style="background-color:#E9E9E9;text-align:center;" |%
! style="background-color:#E9E9E9;text-align:center;" |+/–

|-
| style="background-color: ;" |
| style="text-align:left;" colspan="2" | Barisan Nasional||BN|| 0 || 0 || 0.00 || 0 || 0.00 ||
|-style="background:#EFEFEF;"
| rowspan=3|
| style="background-color: ;" | 
| style="text-align:left;" |United Malays National Organisation||UMNO|| 0 || 0 || 0.00 || 0 || 0.00 ||
|-style="background:#EFEFEF;"
| style="background-color: " |
| style="text-align:left;"|Malaysian Chinese Association||MCA|| 0 || 0 || 0.00 || 0 || 0.00 ||
|-style="background:#EFEFEF;"
| style="background-color: ;" | 
| style="text-align:left;" |Malaysian Indian Congress||MIC|| 0 || 0 || 0.00 || 0 || 0.00 ||
|-
| style="background-color: ;" |
| style="text-align:left;" colspan="2" | Pakatan Harapan ||PH|| 0 || 0 || 0.00 || 0 || 0.00 ||
|-style="background:#EFEFEF;"
| rowspan=3|
| style="background-color: ;" |
| style="text-align:left;" |Democratic Action Party||DAP|| 0 || 0 || 0.00 || 0 || 0.00 ||
|-style="background:#EFEFEF;"
| style="background-color: ;" |
| style="text-align:left;" |National Trust Party||AMANAH|| 0 || 0 || 0.00 || 0 || 0.00 ||
|-style="background:#EFEFEF;"
| style="background-color: ;" |
| style="text-align:left;" |People's Justice Party||PKR|| 0 || 0 || 0.00 || 0 || 0.00 ||
|-
| style="background-color: ;" |
| style="text-align:left;" colspan="2"|Malaysian United Democratic Alliance (Pakatan Harapan ally)||MUDA|| 0 || 0 || 0.00 || 0 || 0.00 ||New
|-
| style="background-color: ;" |
| style="text-align:left;" colspan="2" | Perikatan Nasional ||PN|| 0 || 0 || 0.00 || 0 || 0.00 ||
|-style="background:#EFEFEF;"
| rowspan=3|
| style="background-color: ;" |
| style="text-align:left;" |Malaysian United Indigenous Party||BERSATU|| 0 || 0 || 0.00 || 0 || 0.00 ||
|-style="background:#EFEFEF;"
| style="background-color: ;" |
| style="text-align:left;" |Malaysian Islamic Party||PAS|| 0 || 0 || 0.00 || 0 || 0.00 ||
|-style="background:#EFEFEF;"
| style="background-color: ;" |
| style="text-align:left;" |Malaysian People's Movement Party||GERAKAN|| 0 || 0 || 0.00 || 0 || 0.00 ||
|-
| style="background-color: black;" |
| style="text-align:left;" colspan="2" | Gerakan Tanah Air ||GTA|| 0 || 0 || 0.00 || 0 || 0.00 ||
|-style="background:#EFEFEF;"
| rowspan=3|
| style="background-color: ;" |
| style="text-align:left;"|Homeland Fighters' Party||PEJUANG|| 0 || 0 || 0.00 || 0 || 0.00 ||New
|-style="background:#EFEFEF;"
| style="background-color: ;" |
| style="text-align:left;"|Pan-Malaysian Islamic Front||BERJASA|| 0 || 0 || 0.00 || 0 || 0.00 ||
|-style="background:#EFEFEF;"
| style="background-color:yellow" | 
| style="text-align:left;"|Parti Bumiputera Perkasa Malaysia||PUTRA|| 0 || 0 || 0.00 || 0 || 0.00 ||New
|-
| style="background-color: ;" | 	
| style="text-align:left;" colspan="2" |Independents||IND|| 0 || 0 || 0.00 || 0 || 0.00 ||
|-
| style="text-align:left;" colspan="5" |Valid votes|| 0 ||rowspan=2 colspan="4" style="background-color:#dcdcdc"|
|-
| style="text-align:left;" colspan="5" |Invalid/blank votes|| 0
|-
| style="text-align:left;" colspan="5" |Total votes (voter turnout : 0.00%)|| 0 || 0.00 || 42 || 100.00 || 0
|-
| style="text-align:left;" colspan="5" |Did not vote|| 0 ||rowspan="7" colspan="4" style="background-color:#dcdcdc;"|
|-
| style="text-align:left;" colspan="5" |Registered voters||0
|-
| || style="text-align:left;" colspan="4" |Ordinary voters|| 0
|-
| || style="text-align:left;" colspan="4" |Early voters|| 0
|-
| || style="text-align:left;" colspan="4" |Postal voters|| 0
|-
| style="text-align:left;" colspan="10" | Source: calculation based on https://dashboard.spr.gov.my/#!/home
|}

Notes

References 

2023 elections in Malaysia
2023
2023 in Malaysia
2023 in Malaysian politics